Jean-Christophe Faurel (born 6 March 1981) is a former professional tennis player from France. He has been Coco Gauff's coach since March 2019, four months before her Wimbledon breakthrough, where she defeated Venus Williams in at age 15, before reaching the fourth round.

Career
Faurel was a boys' singles quarter-finalist at the 1999 Australian Open.

In 2006, he appeared in three Grand Slam tournaments. At the Australian Open he defeated Alexander Waske and was then beaten in the second round by 20th seed James Blake, over four sets. He exited in the first round of the French Open, at the hands of Olivier Rochus and also failed to make it past the opening round in Wimbledon, losing to Gastón Gaudio.
 
He had his best win on the ATP Tour at the 2006 Open 13, held in Marseille, where he defeated Feliciano López, the world number 38.

Faurel currently coaches Coco Gauff, along with her father. He began working with her four months before her breakthrough at the 2019 Wimbledon, where she defeated Venus Williams in straight sets at age 15, before reaching the fourth round. He was with her when she reached the third round at the 2019 US Open, and when she won her first WTA title at Linz the following month.

Challenger titles

Singles: (1)

References

1981 births
Living people
French male tennis players
French tennis coaches
People from Rueil-Malmaison